The Immaculate Heart of Mary Cathedral also simply called Cathedral of Bo, is a religious building belonging to the Catholic Church, and is located in the town of Bo the second largest in population (behind Freetown, the capital) and of the Southern Province, in the African country of Sierra Leone.

The cathedral began as parish church until 2011 had the status of pro-cathedral. It follows the Roman Catholic or Latin rite and serves as the seat of the diocese of Bo (Dioecesis Boënsis) which was created in 2011 by Pope Benedict XVI through the bull Petrini ministerii.

It is under the pastoral responsibility of the Bishop Charles Allieu Matthew Campbell.

See also
Immaculate Heart of Mary Cathedral
Roman Catholicism in Sierra Leone

References

Roman Catholic cathedrals in Sierra Leone
Buildings and structures in Bo, Sierra Leone